Barış Aysu (born 10 May 1992) is a Turkish footballer who plays as a defender for Halide Edip Adivarspor.

References

External links
 Sofot
 Tr.org

1992 births
Living people
Turkish footballers
Kardemir Karabükspor footballers
Süper Lig players
Sportspeople from Ordu

Association football midfielders